Alan Banks is the name of:

Inspector Alan Banks, fictional protagonist of Peter Robinson's series of novels
Alan Banks (footballer) (born 1938), retired English professional footballer
Alan Banks (rugby league) (born 1965), English rugby league footballer of the 1980s and 1990s